Georgian–Turkish relations are foreign relations between Georgia and Turkey.
Georgia has an embassy in Ankara, and two consulates–general in Istanbul and Trabzon. Turkey has an embassy in Tbilisi, and a consulate–general in Batumi. Both countries are full members of the Council of Europe, the Organization for Security and Co-operation in Europe, the BLACKSEAFOR (Black Sea Naval Co-operation Task Group), the Organization of the Black Sea Economic Cooperation and the World Trade Organization. Turkey is already a member of NATO, while Georgia is a candidate.

There are several thousand ethnic Georgians in Turkey and a smaller number of Turks (Meskhetian Turks) resident in Georgia. Due to centuries-old historical and cultural connections between the two countries, relations are generally cordial although disputes occasionally arise.

History
After the dissolution of the Soviet Union, Turkey recognized the independence of Georgia on 16 December 1991. The formal Protocol on the Establishment of Diplomatic Relations between the two countries was signed on 21 May 1992.

In 2013, a Turkish nationalist map published had included the territory of Adjara into Turkish territory, which has caused friction and hostility between Georgia and Turkey. The issue has been largely downplayed, however in 2017, Turkish President Recep Tayyip Erdoğan made a speech mentioning Georgian city Batumi, causing friction to return.

Agreements
A free trade agreement is currently in force.

Resident diplomatic missions

of Georgia
Ankara (Embassy)
Istanbul (Consulate-General)
Trabzon (Consulate-General)

of Turkey
Tbilisi (Embassy)
Batumi (Consulate-General)

See also 

 Foreign relations of Georgia (country)
 Foreign relations of Turkey
 Georgia–Turkey border
 Georgians in Turkey
 Turks in Georgia

References

 
Turkey
Bilateral relations of Turkey
Relations of colonizer and former colony